The 2020 Nicky Rackard Cup is the 16th staging of the Nicky Rackard Cup hurling championship since its establishment by the Gaelic Athletic Association in 2005. It is the fourth tier hurling as of 2020.

Warwickshire were supposed to compete in the Rackard Cup  but did not due to the impact of the COVID-19 pandemic on Gaelic games. The championship was scheduled to begin in May 2020 but was delayed until 24 October 2020.

Team changes

To Championship 
Relegated from the Christy Ring Cup

 Donegal

Promoted from the Lory Meagher Cup

 Leitrim

From Championship 
Promoted to the Christy Ring Cup

 Sligo

Relegated to the Lory Meagher Cup

 Louth

Format 
Seven teams compete in the 2020 Nicky Rackard Cup.

Six teams play each in the three Round 1 games. One team receives a bye to Round 2A.
The three Round 1 winners, plus the team that received a bye, play in Round 2A.
The two Round 2A winners advance to the semi-finals.
The losers of the game between a Round 1 winner and the bye-receiving team goes into Round 2B.
The three Round 1 losers and one of the Round 2A losers play in Round 2B.
The Round 2B winners advance to the semi-finals.
The semi-finals are played between the two Round 2A winners and the two Round 2B winners.
The final is between the two semi-final winners.

Round 1

Round 2

Round 2A 
The Round 1 winners are joined by Tyrone, who received a bye.

Round 2B 
The Round 1 losers are joined by Tyrone, who lost their Round 2A game.

Semi-finals 
The Round 2A winners play the Round 2B winners.

Final

References 

Nicky Rackard Cup
Nicky Rackard Cup
Nicky Rackard Cup